The 2015 Texas A&M–Commerce Lions football team represented Texas A&M University–Commerce as a member of the Lone Star Conference (LSC) during the 2015 NCAA Division II football season. Led by third-year head coach Colby Carthel, the Lions compiled an overall record of 8–4 with a mark of 6–0 in conference play, winning the LSC title for the second consecutive season. The Lions were ranked No. 23 in the final NCAA Division II poll. The team played their games at Memorial Stadium on the university's campus in Commerce, Texas.

Schedule

Postseason awards

All-Americans
Elwood Clement, First Team Offensive Line
Richard Cooper, First Team Running Back
Darian Lindsey, First Team Safety
DeMarlon Morris, First Team Defensive Back
Shane Thompson, First Team Offensive Line
Toni Pulu, Second Team Defensive Line
Tyree Barton, Honorable Mention Defensive Line
Cole Pitts, Honorable Mention Linebacker
Harrison Stewart, Honorable Mention Quarterback 
Theo Wofford, Honorable Mention Running Back
Charles Wood, Honorable Mention Linebacker

All-Lone Star Conference

LSC Superlatives
Offensive Back of the Year: Richard Cooper

LSC First Team
Elwood Clement, Offensive Line
Richard Cooper, Running Back
Lance Evans, Receiver 
Darian Lindsey, Safety
Cole Pitts, Linebacker
Toni Pulu, Defensive Line
Buck Wilson, Return Specialist

LSC Second Team
Tyree Barton, Defensive Line
DeMarlon Morris, Cornerback
Jason Osei, Offensive Line
Cameron Rogers, Deep Snapper
Devarus Shores, Linebacker
Darby Smith, Receiver
Harrison Stewart, Quarterback 
Theo Wofford, Running Back
Charles Woods, Linebacker

LSC Honorable Mention
Keiston Carter, Defensive End
Chris Chumley, Tight End
Derrick Macon, Receiver 
Kristov Martinez, Kicker 
Kevin Mederias, Cornerback 
Avery Poates, Offensive Line
Tre'Von Taylor, Linebacker
Shane Thompson, Offensive Line
Chase Thrasher, Punter
Landon Watkins, Center

References

Texas AandM-Commerce
Texas A&M–Commerce Lions football seasons
Lone Star Conference football champion seasons
Texas AandM-Commerce Lions football